Ophthalmology may refer to:

A branch of medicine called ophthalmology
A medical journal called Ophthalmology (journal)
A medical journal called Archives of Ophthalmology